Mantua Township could be referring to:

Mantua Township, New Jersey
Mantua Township, Portage County, Ohio